This list of streets in Copenhagen lists streets in Copenhagen, Denmark.

City centre

Christianshavn

Amager

Frederiksberg

Nørrebro

Østerbro

Valby

Vesterbro/Kongens Enghave

References

External links
 Historic images
 Streets 1863
 Images
 Images
 Source
 Source

 
Streets
Copenhagen